Empty Days & Sleepless Nights is the second studio album by the American melodic hardcore band Defeater. The album was released on March 8, 2011, through Bridge Nine Records. It was recorded at guitarist Jay Maas' Getaway Recording Studios in Wakefield, Massachusetts.

Background
Though bassist Mike Poulin was a member of the band at the time, bass on the record was contributed by former guitarist Gus Pesce and Jay Maas. The album is split into two parts; the first, Empty Days, showcases the band's usual melodic/post-hardcore style, while the second, Sleepless Nights consists of 4 acoustic tracks. Like Defeater's other records, it is a concept album, following the story of a different character from the plot outline first presented in Travels.

Track listing 
Empty Days
 "Warm Blood Rush" – 2:28
 "Dear Father" – 2:51
 "Waves Crash, Clouds Roll" – 2:39
 "Empty Glass" – 3:31
 "No Kind of Home" – 2:37
 "White Knuckles" – 2:10
 "Cemetery Walls" – 3:31
 "Quiet the Longing" – 3:54
 "At Peace" – 3:16
 "White Oak Doors" – 7:00

Sleepless Nights
 "But Breathing" – 3:40
 "Brothers" – 5:05
 "I Don't Mind" – 3:48
 "Headstone" – 2:58

Personnel
Defeater
 Derek Archambault – vocals
 Jay Maas – guitars, additional bass, vocals
 Andy Reitz – drums
 Jake Woodruff – guitars
Additional musicians
 Gus Pesce – bass
 Bob Mallory – cello on "Brothers"
 Eli Cohn – violin on "Brothers"
 Cal Joss – pedal steel on "But Breathing", "Brothers" and "I Don't Mind"
Production
 Jay Maas – recording, mixing, mastering
 Michael Winters – photography
 Chris Wrenn – layout, design
 Steve Minerva – scratch board art

References 

2011 albums
Defeater (band) albums
Bridge 9 Records albums